On 12 July 1213, Frederick II, Holy Roman Emperor made a Golden Bull by which Frederick offered his obedience to the Pope and pledged himself to the principle of free canonical elections by the chapters, unhampered liberty of appeal to Rome on ecclesiastical issues, and abandonment of the traditional rights of the Crown to the personal estate of deceased bishops (Spolienrecht) and the Revenues of vacant sees (Regalienrecht).

Bibliography

References

13th-century documents
Golden Bulls
1210s in the Holy Roman Empire
1213 in Europe
13th-century Christianity
Frederick II, Holy Roman Emperor